Demilu (also Romanized as Demīlū, Damiloo, and Domīlū) is a village in Gachin Rural District, in the Central District of Bandar Abbas County, Hormozgan Province, Iran. At the 2006 census, its population was 1,229, in 276 families.

References 

Populated places in Bandar Abbas County